Hezar Masjed Mountains are a group of mountains that form the southeastern section of the Kopet-Dag Range. Located about 20 kilometres east of Dargaz and 70 kilometres north of Mashhad in Razavi Khorasan Province in Iran and stretched in a northwest-southeast direction (from northwest to northeast of Mashhad), the mountains are situated almost at the extreme northeastern part of Iran. With an elevation of 3040 metres, Mount Hezar Masjed is the highest peak of the group and is located almost in central section of the Hezar Masjed Mountains.

Etymology
In Persian, “Hezar Masjed” could be considered as two words: “hezar” which means “thousand” and “masjed” that means “mosque”. So “Hezar Masjed” means “a thousand mosques”, referring to the shape and form of the mountains which almost look like the domes and minarets of mosques.

Geology
Geologically the mountains were formed mainly in the Miocene and Pliocene and are chiefly made of Jurassic limestone rocks. The north and northwestern sections of the mountains are mainly made of Lower Cretaceous limestones.

References

Landforms of Razavi Khorasan Province
Mountains of Razavi Khorasan Province
Mountains of Iran